Gnorimoschema is a genus of moths in the family Gelechiidae.

Species
Gnorimoschema alaricella Busck, 1908
Gnorimoschema alaskense Povolný, 1967
Gnorimoschema albangulatum Braun, 1926
Gnorimoschema albestre Povolný, 2003
Gnorimoschema albimarginella (Chambers, 1875)
Gnorimoschema ambrosiaeella (Chambers, 1875)
Gnorimoschema anomale Povolný, 2003
Gnorimoschema assimile Povolný, 2003
Gnorimoschema aterrimum Powell & Povolný, 2001
Gnorimoschema baccharisella Busck, 1903
Gnorimoschema bacchariselloides Powell & Povolný, 2001
Gnorimoschema banksiella Busck, 1903
Gnorimoschema batanella Busck, 1903
Gnorimoschema bodillum Karsholt & Nielsen, 1974
Gnorimoschema brachiatum Povolný, 1998
Gnorimoschema brackenridgiella (Busck, 1903)
Gnorimoschema busckiella Kearfott, 1903
Gnorimoschema clavatum Povolný, 1998
Gnorimoschema collinusella (Chambers, 1877)
Gnorimoschema compsomorpha Meyrick, 1929
Gnorimoschema contraria Braun, 1921
Gnorimoschema coquillettella Busck, 1902
Gnorimoschema crypticum Powell & Povolný, 2001
Gnorimoschema curiosum Povolný, 2003
Gnorimoschema debenedictisi Powell & Povolný, 2001
Gnorimoschema dryosyrta (Meyrick, 1931)
Gnorimoschema dudiella Busck, 1903
Gnorimoschema elatior Povolný, 2003
Gnorimoschema elbursicum Povolný, 1984
Gnorimoschema epithymella (Staudinger, 1859)
Gnorimoschema ericameriae Keifer, 1933
Gnorimoschema ericoidesi Powell & Povolný, 2001
Gnorimoschema faustella Busck, 1910
Gnorimoschema ferrugineum Povolný, 2003
Gnorimoschema florella Busck, 1903
Gnorimoschema foliatum Povolný, 2003
Gnorimoschema gallaeasterella (Kellicott, 1878)
Gnorimoschema gallaesolidaginis (Riley, 1869)
Gnorimoschema gallaespeciosum Miller, 2000
Gnorimoschema geminum Povolný, 2003
Gnorimoschema generale Povolný, 2003
Gnorimoschema gibsoniella Busck, 1915
Gnorimoschema gracile Povolný, 2003
Gnorimoschema grindeliae Powell & Povolný, 2001
Gnorimoschema grisella (Chambers, 1872)
Gnorimoschema herbichii (Nowicki, 1864)
Gnorimoschema hoefneri (Rebel, 1909)
Gnorimoschema huffmanellum Metzler & Adamski, 2002
Gnorimoschema ilyella (Zeller, 1877)
Gnorimoschema inexperta (Meyrick, 1925)
Gnorimoschema intermedium Povolný, 2003
Gnorimoschema interrogationum Povolný, 2003
Gnorimoschema jalavai Povolný, 1994
Gnorimoschema jocelynae Miller, 2000
Gnorimoschema klotsi Povolný, 1967
Gnorimoschema lateritium Povolný, 2003
Gnorimoschema ligulatum Povolný, 1998
Gnorimoschema lipatiella (Busck, 1909)
Gnorimoschema lobatum (Povolný, 1998)
Gnorimoschema marmorella (Chambers, 1875)
Gnorimoschema mikkolai Povolný, 1994
Gnorimoschema milleriella (Chambers, 1875)
Gnorimoschema minor (Busck, 1906)
Gnorimoschema motasi (Povolný, 1977)
Gnorimoschema nanulum Povolný, 1998
Gnorimoschema navajorum Povolný, 2003
Gnorimoschema nilsi Huemer, 1996
Gnorimoschema nordlandicolella (Strand, 1902)
Gnorimoschema nupponeni Huemer & Karsholt, 2010
Gnorimoschema obscurior Povolný, 1998
Gnorimoschema octomaculella (Chambers, 1875)
Gnorimoschema ovinum Povolný, 2003
Gnorimoschema paternale Povolný, 2003
Gnorimoschema pedmontella (Chambers, 1877)
Gnorimoschema penetrans Povolný, 2003
Gnorimoschema perditum Povolný, 2003
Gnorimoschema petiolatum Povolný, 1998
Gnorimoschema pocketosum Povolný, 2003
Gnorimoschema powelli Povolný, 1998
Gnorimoschema radkevichi Piskunov, 1980
Gnorimoschema ramulata (Meyrick, 1926)
Gnorimoschema reichli (Povolný, 1998)
Gnorimoschema robustella (Staudinger, 1871)
Gnorimoschema rotundatum Povolný, 1998
Gnorimoschema salinaris Busck, 1911
Gnorimoschema saphirinella (Chambers, 1875)
Gnorimoschema segregatum (Povolný, 1998)
Gnorimoschema semicyclionella Busck, 1903
Gnorimoschema septentrionella Fyles, 1911
Gnorimoschema serratipalpella (Chambers, 1877)
Gnorimoschema shepherdiae Priest, 2014
Gnorimoschema signatum Povolný, 2003
Gnorimoschema siskiouense Povolný, 1985
Gnorimoschema slabaughi Miller, 2000
Gnorimoschema soffneri Riedl, 1965
Gnorimoschema spinosum Povolný, 1998
Gnorimoschema splendoriferella Busck, 1904
Gnorimoschema sporomochla Meyrick, 1929
Gnorimoschema steueri Povolný, 1975
Gnorimoschema stigmaticum Powell & Povolný, 2001
Gnorimoschema streliciella (Herrich-Schaffer, 1854)
Gnorimoschema subterranea Busck, 1911
Gnorimoschema tediosum Povolný, 2003
Gnorimoschema tenerum Powell & Povolný, 2001
Gnorimoschema terracottella Busck, 1900
Gnorimoschema triforceps Povolný, 2003
Gnorimoschema trilobatum Povolný, 2003
Gnorimoschema triocellella (Chambers, 1877)
Gnorimoschema tunicatum Povolný, 1998
Gnorimoschema valesiella (Staudinger, 1877)
Gnorimoschema vastificum Braun, 1926
Gnorimoschema versicolorella (Chambers, 1872)
Gnorimoschema vibei (Wolff, 1964)
Gnorimoschema wagneri Povolný, 2003
Gnorimoschema washingtoniella Busck, 1904

Former species
Gnorimoschema gudmannella (Walsingham 1897)

References

 , 2002: A new species of Gnorimoschema Busck, 1900 (Lepidoptera: Gelechiidae: Gelechiinae) from Ohio and Illinois. Fabreries 27 (1): 59-68.
 , 1984: Drei neue Arten der Tribus Gnorimoschemini (Lepidoptera, Gelechiidae) aus Asien. Nota Lepidopterologica 7 (3): 264-270.
 , 1994: New taxa and records of Gnorischema Busck and Gobipalpa Povolný from Palaearctic Asia (Lepidoptera: Gelechiidae). Entomologica Fennica 5 (1): 57-64. Abstract: .
 , 1998: New taxa and faunistic records of the tribe Gnorimoschemini from the Nearctic Region (Lepidoptera: Gelechiidae). Stapfia 55: 327-347.
 , 2003: Description of twenty five new Nearctic species of the genus Gnorimoschema Busck, 1900 (Lepidoptera: Gelechiidae). Shilap Revista de Lepidopterologia 31 (124): 285-315.
 , 2001: Gnorimoschemine moths of coastal dune and scrub habitats in California (Lepidoptera: Gelechiidae). Holarctic Lepidoptera (Gainesville), 8(suppl. 1): 1–53.

 
Gnorimoschemini